Artemisia pedatifida is a species of flowering plant in the aster family known by the common names birdfoot sagebrush and matted sagewort. It is native to a section of the west-central United States encompassing parts of Idaho, Montana, Wyoming and Colorado, where it occurs on the high plains.

This plant is a perennial herb or small subshrub growing up to about 15 centimeters tall. There are several stems growing from a woody base atop a woody root. The small, gray-green leaves occur in a tuft around the woody base. The inflorescence contains a number of round flower heads which each have a few pistillate ray florets and a few disc florets. The plant reproduces by seed.

This sagebrush grows on grasslands and shrublands in mountains and on plains. It grows with many types of grasses and a few shrubs such as Gardner's saltbush (Atriplex gardneri) and winterfat (Krascheninnikovia lanata).

References

External links
The Nature Conservancy

pedatifida
Plants described in 1841
Flora of the Western United States